The Genevieve E. Yates Memorial Centre houses two performance theatres in downtown Lethbridge, Alberta. The centre was built starting 15 August 1965 and officially opened 1 May 1966. Deane Yates, a local retailer, donated over $200,000 towards its existence and asked the centre be named Genevieve E. Yates Memorial.

Its two theatres are the 500-seat proscenium Yates Theatre and the 180-seat black box Sterndale Bennett Theatre named after the actor/director Ernest Sterndale Bennett, a grandson of the composer Sir William Sterndale Bennett and who, in December 1974, was appointed a Member of the Order of Canada for services to the theatre. An art gallery exists in the upper mezzanine area, which is operated by the Allied Arts Council of Lethbridge.

External links

 Yates and Sterndale Bennett Theatres
 

Culture of Lethbridge
Buildings and structures completed in 1966
Theatres in Alberta
Performing arts centres in Canada
Art museums and galleries in Alberta
Buildings and structures in Lethbridge
Tourist attractions in Lethbridge